Topolnoye is a rural locality (a selo) and the administrative center of Topolinsky Selsoviet, Soloneshensky District, Altai Krai, Russia. The population was 991 as of 2013. There are 6 streets.

Geography 
Topolnoye is located 24 km southeast of Soloneshnoye (the district's administrative centre) by road.

References 

Rural localities in Soloneshensky District